Usually non-critical string theory is considered in frames of the approach proposed by Polyakov. The other approach has been developed in. It represents a universal method to maintain explicit Lorentz invariance in any quantum relativistic theory. On an example of Nambu-Goto string theory in 4-dimensional Minkowski space-time the idea can be demonstrated as follows:

Geometrically the world sheet of string is sliced by a system of 
parallel planes to fix a specific 
parametrization, or 
gauge on it.
The planes are defined by a normal vector nμ, the gauge axis.
If this vector belongs to light cone, the parametrization corresponds
to light cone gauge, if it is directed along world sheet's 
period Pμ,
it is time-like Rohrlich's gauge.
The problem of the standard light 
cone gauge is that the vector nμ is constant, e.g. 
nμ = (1, 1, 0, 0), 
and the system of planes is "frozen" in Minkowski
space-time. Lorentz transformations change the position of the 
world sheet with respect to these fixed planes, and they are followed 
by reparametrizations of the world sheet. On the quantum level the 
reparametrization group has anomaly, 
which appears also in Lorentz group 
and violates Lorentz invariance of the theory. On the other hand, 
the Rohrlich's gauge relates nμ with the world sheet itself. 
As a result, the Lorentz generators transform nμ 
and the world sheet 
simultaneously, without reparametrizations. The same property holds 
if one relates light-like axis nμ with the world sheet, using in 
addition to Pμ other dynamical vectors available 
in string theory. 
In this way one constructs Lorentz-invariant parametrization of 
the world sheet, where the Lorentz group acts trivially and does not
have quantum anomalies.

Algebraically this corresponds to a canonical transformation ai -> bi in the classical mechanics to a new set of variables, explicitly containing all necessary generators of symmetries. For the standard light cone gauge the Lorentz generators Mμν are cubic in terms of oscillator variables ai, and their quantization acquires well known anomaly. Consider a set bi = (Mμν,ξi) which contains the Lorentz group generators and internal variables ξi, complementing Mμν 
to the full phase space. In selection of such a set, 
one needs to take care that ξi will have simple Poisson brackets with Mμν and among themselves. Local existence of such variables is provided by Darboux's theorem. Quantization in the new set of variables eliminates anomaly from the Lorentz group. Canonically equivalent classical theories do not necessarily correspond to unitary equivalent quantum theories, that's why quantum anomalies could be present in one approach and absent in the other one.

Group-theoretically 
string theory has a gauge symmetry Diff S1, 
reparametrizations of a circle. The symmetry is generated by 
Virasoro algebra Ln. 
Standard light cone gauge fixes the most of gauge degrees
of freedom leaving only trivial phase rotations U(1) ~ S1. 
They correspond
to periodical string evolution, generated by 
Hamiltonian L0.
Let's introduce an additional layer on this diagram:
a group G = U(1) x SO(3) of gauge transformations of the world sheet, 
including the trivial evolution factor and rotations of the gauge axis
in center-of-mass frame, with respect to the fixed world sheet. 
Standard light cone gauge 
corresponds to a selection of one point in SO(3) factor, leading to 
Lorentz non-invariant parametrization. Therefore, one must select
a different representative on the gauge orbit of G, this time 
related with the world sheet in Lorentz invariant way. 
After reduction of the mechanics to this representative
anomalous gauge degrees of freedom are removed from the theory.
The trivial gauge symmetry U(1) x U(1) remains, including evolution 
and those rotations which preserve the direction of gauge axis.
 
Successful implementation of this program has been done in 

.
These are several unitary non-equivalent versions of
the quantum open Nambu-Goto string theory, where the gauge axis 
is attached to different geometrical features of the world sheet.
Their common properties are

 explicit Lorentz-invariance at d=4
 reparametrization degrees of freedom fixed by the gauge
 Regge-like spin-mass spectrum

The reader familiar with variety of branches co-existing 
in modern string theory
will not wonder why many different quantum theories 
can be constructed for essentially the same physical system.
The approach described here does not intend to produce
a unique ultimate result, it just provides a set of tools
suitable for construction of your own quantum string theory.
Since any value of dimension can be used, and especially
d=4, the applications could be more realistic.
For example, the approach can be applied in 
physics of hadrons, 
to describe their spectra and electromagnetic interactions
.

References

See also 

The following textbooks on string theory mention a possibility
of anomaly-free quantization of the string outside critical dimension:

 L. Brink, M. Henneaux, Principles of String Theory, Plenum Press, New York and London, (1988), p. 157

Further, on pp. 157–159, the quantum solutions of closed string theory
in the class of non-oscillator representations possessing no anomaly
in Virasoro algebra at arbitrary even value of dimension are
explicitly presented.

 B.M. Barbashov, V.V. Nesterenko, Introduction to the Relativistic String Theory, Singapore, World Scientific, (1990), p. 64:

Further, in Sec.11 and Sec.30 quantization of non-critical
string theory in frames of the approaches by Rohrlich and Polyakov
is described.

 M. Green, J. Schwarz, E. Witten, Superstring Theory Vol. 1, Cambridge Univ. Press, (1987), p. 124: 
considering contribution of conformal factor φ 
in the path integral, it is noticed:

Note: this does not exclude usage of non-critical string theory
in the physics of hadrons, where all coupled states are massive.
Here only self-consistence of the theory, particularly its
Lorentz invariance, is required.

String theory